Rasmus Jensen may refer to:

Rasmus Jensen (priest), first Lutheran priest in Canada 
Rasmus Jensen (speedway rider), Danish motorcycle rider